Mad Dogs and Englishmen may refer to:

"Mad Dogs and Englishmen" (song), 1931 song by Noël Coward
Mad Dogs & Englishmen (album), 1970 live album by Joe Cocker
Mad Dogs & Englishmen (film), 1971 Joe Cocker music film
Mad Dogs and Englishmen (film), 1995 Canadian/British film
Mad Dogs and Englishmen (novel), 2002 Doctor Who novel
"Mad Dogs and Englishmen", a song by Late of the Pier from the 2008 album Fantasy Black Channel
"Ballad of Mad Dogs and Englishmen", single by Leon Russell from the 1971 music film and included in the album Leon Russell and the Shelter People